The following events occurred in February 1955:

February 1, 1955 (Tuesday)

February 2, 1955 (Wednesday)

February 3, 1955 (Thursday)

February 4, 1955 (Friday)
The Pact of Mutual Cooperation ("Baghdad Pact") is signed.
British Navy W-class destroyer  runs aground at Villefranche sur Mer, France. Refloated on 6 February by Marine Nationale and Marina Militare tugs.

February 5, 1955 (Saturday)

February 6, 1955 (Sunday)

February 7, 1955 (Monday)

February 8, 1955 (Tuesday)
 Nikolai Bulganin is new Chairman of the Council of Ministers of the Soviet Union,  succeeding Georgy Malenkov.

February 9, 1955 (Wednesday)
Apartheid in South Africa: 60,000 non-white residents of the Sophiatown suburb of Johannesburg are forcibly evicted.
Twenty nautical miles (37 km) southeast of the Tachen Islands, the Peoples Republic of China shoots down a U.S. Navy AD Skyraider attack aircraft covering the evacuation of Nationalist Chinese forces from the islands.
In Italy, the Rome Metro opens to passengers.

February 10, 1955 (Thursday)
The United States Seventh Fleet helps the Republic of China evacuate Chinese Nationalist army and residents from the Tachen Islands to Taiwan.
Born: Chris Adams, English wrestler and judoka (d. 2001)

February 11, 1955 (Friday)
Died: Ona Munson, American actress (b. 1903)

February 12, 1955 (Saturday)
U.S. President Dwight D. Eisenhower sends the first U.S. advisors to South Vietnam.
Died:
Thomas J. Moore, Irish-American film actor (b. 1883)
S. Z. Sakall, Hungarian actor (b. 1883)

February 13, 1955 (Sunday)
 Sabena Flight 503: Douglas DC-6 of the Belgian airline company Sabena crashed into Monte Terminillo near Rieti, Italy, killing all 29 people on board.
 Died: Marcella Mariani, 19, Italian actress and model, passenger of Sabena Flight 503

February 14, 1955 (Monday)
All fifteen crew were rescued by Sunny Prince and landed at Dover.

February 15, 1955 (Tuesday)

February 16, 1955 (Wednesday)
Nearly 100 die in a fire at a home for the elderly in Yokohama, Japan.

February 17, 1955 (Thursday)

February 18, 1955 (Friday)
The Cambodian Red Cross is established.

February 19, 1955 (Saturday)
The Southeast Asia Treaty Organization is established at a meeting in Bangkok.

February 20, 1955 (Sunday)
Died: Oswald Avery, 77, US physician and medical researcher

February 21, 1955 (Monday)

Born: Kelsey Grammer, American actor and producer, in St. Thomas, U.S. Virgin Islands

February 22, 1955 (Tuesday)
In Chicago's Democratic primary, Mayor Martin H. Kennelly loses to the head of the Cook County Democratic Party, Richard J. Daley, by 364,839 votes to 264,077.

February 23, 1955 (Wednesday)
Died: Paul Claudel, 86, French poet, dramatist, and diplomat

February 24, 1955 (Thursday)
Born: 
Steve Jobs, US businessman and founder of Apple Inc, in San Francisco, California (d. 2011)
Woo Bum-kon, South Korean policeman and spree killer, in Pusan, South Gyeongsang (d. 1982)

February 25, 1955 (Friday)
Pope Pius XII creates the Roman Catholic Diocese of Penang and the Roman Catholic Diocese of Kuala Lumpur.
New Zealand philanthropist Edith Winstone Blackwell is awarded the MBE by Governor General Sir Willoughby Norrie.

February 26, 1955 (Saturday)
George F. Smith becomes the first person to survive a supersonic ejection, from a North American F-100 Super Sabre travelling at Mach 1.05.

February 27, 1955 (Sunday)
Died: Trixie Friganza, 84, US actress

February 28, 1955 (Monday)
The Maltese general election ends in another victory for the Malta Labour Party, which wins 23 of the 40 seats.
Born: Gilbert Gottfried, American stand up comedian and actor, in Brooklyn, New York (d. 2022)

References

1955
1955-02
1955-02